Dora Drake (born 1992/1993) is an American politician and community advocate.  A Democrat, she represents the 11th assembly district in the Wisconsin State Assembly.  The 11th district comprises northern neighborhoods within the city of Milwaukee.  She was elected to her first term in November 2020.

Early life and education
Dora Drake was born and raised in the Graceland neighborhood of Milwaukee, Wisconsin.  She was accepted into Marquette University's Educational Opportunities Program and graduated with her bachelor's degree in Social Welfare and Justice in 2015.  Shortly after graduating, she was employed by JusticePoint, a nonprofit organization promoting reforms to the criminal justice system and supporting people through their interactions with the justice system.

Political career
Through her involvement in her community, she became involved in local politics and was employed as campaign manager for the 2019 school board campaign of Shyla Deacon.  Deacon ultimately fell 27 votes short of her opponent in the spring election.

Following the campaign, Drake was employed at the Center for Self Sufficiency, which assists formerly incarcerated people with family support and reentry services.  But a year after the end of the Deacon campaign, Drake announced her own candidacy for Wisconsin State Assembly in the 11th district with the support of Emerge Wisconsin, an organization which recruits, trains, and supports Democratic women running for office in Wisconsin.  The 11th district had been represented by Democrat Jason Fields, who had run for Milwaukee city comptroller in the spring election.  He announced after losing that election that he would not run for re-election in the Assembly.  Three other candidates ultimately also ran in the Democratic primary for this seat, with Drake prevailing with 47% of the vote.  Drake prevailed by a wide margin in the general election over Republican candidate Orlando Owens.  She is one of 16 new assemblymembers elected in the 2020 election.

Personal life and family
Dora Drake is the oldest of eight children.  She is a worship singer at Milwaukee's New Horizons Integrated Ministries.

Electoral history

Wisconsin Assembly (2020)

| colspan="6" style="text-align:center;background-color: #e9e9e9;"| Democratic Primary, August 11, 2020

| colspan="6" style="text-align:center;background-color: #e9e9e9;"| General Election, November 3, 2020

References

External links
 
 
 Campaign website
 JusticePoint 
 Center for Self Sufficiency
 New Horizons Integrated Ministries
 Emerge Wisconsin

Living people
Year of birth missing (living people)
Politicians from Milwaukee
Women state legislators in Wisconsin
Democratic Party members of the Wisconsin State Assembly
21st-century American politicians
21st-century American women politicians
Marquette University alumni
African-American women in politics
African-American state legislators in Wisconsin
21st-century African-American women
21st-century African-American politicians